The House of the Vice President it is the official residence of the vice president of Colombia located in the same sector in Bogotá where the House of Nariño is located.

The vice presidential house has served as the official residence of the vice president of Colombia since 1999, the year in which the building's adaptations were completed. The residence has a main building where the vice presidencial family resides, in addition to two other buildings where the office of the vice president is located as well as the rest of his vice presidential staff.

The building
The construction contemplates the family house for the Vice President and a garden. It incorporates two republican houses as offices, and the main entrance to the complex is through the eighth street, going under a large longitudinal water staircase divided into sections at different levels.

The complex is organized into four bays around a square patio with a wide gallery around it. In general, ceramic materials were used to qualify the internal and external walls and vaults of the house.

The Vice Presidential's House is a replica of the Cartagena Guest House. The architectural work was designed by Rogelio Salmona, and was also acquired by the Banco Central Hipotecario in 1993. It was bought by the government of César Gaviria and in 1999 during the presidency of Andrés Pastrana it was allocated to the vice-presidents, making it the first to Inhabiting it was Gustavo Bell and then the turn of Francisco Santos who was during the two terms of Álvaro Uribe in the residence.

Salmona chose the place for its location, landscape, natural vegetation and especially for the presence of the fortified ruins of the old provision warehouse with 117 square meters, which are entrusted to the architect Germán Téllez. Between Téllez and Salmona they established the right spatial and volumetric relationships between the new house and the old fort.

On the part of Salmona, he used historical references pre-Hispanic, Hispano-Moorish architectures. The layout of the house is based on a system of circulation axes and patios, each of them endowed with a special character. The functional layout is simple and responds to the demands of a home that can accommodate many people at the same time, without losing the character and domestic scale of the spaces.

The materials used in the work are mainly brick, coral rock, tile, concrete and hard wood. Natural elements also play an important role as building materials for the space and each of the patios was named after a natural characteristic that defines it.

See also
Number One Observatory Circle
Vice President's House, New Delhi
Jaburu Palace

References

Official residences in Colombia
Buildings and structures in Bogotá
Palaces in Colombia
Presidential residences
Government buildings in Colombia
Buildings and structures completed in 1908
1999 establishments in Colombia
Architecture of Bogotá